The Undisputed British Women's Championship is a women's professional wrestling championship owned by the Revolution Pro Wrestling (RevPro/RPW) promotion. The title was created and debuted on 7 January 2018 as British Women's Championship. There have been a total of 7 reigns shared between fiev different champions. The current champion is Alex Windsor who is in her first reign.

Inaugural championship tournament (2018)

Reigns

Combined reigns 

See also

Professional wrestling in the United Kingdom
RPW British Heavyweight Championship
RPW Undisputed British Tag Team Championship
RPW British Cruiserweight Championship

References

External links
British Women's Championship (RevPro)

Revolution Pro Wrestling championships
Women's professional wrestling championships
National professional wrestling championships
Professional wrestling in the United Kingdom